Betty Esther Naluyima is a Ugandan politician and member of parliament. She was elected in office as a member of the parliament for Wakiso district during the 2021 Uganda general elections.

She is a member of the National Unity Platform party.

See also 
 List of members of the eleventh Parliament of Uganda
National Unity Platform
Wakiso District
Member of Parliament
Parliament of Uganda.

References

External links 

 Website of the Parliament of Uganda

Members of the Parliament of Uganda
Women members of the Parliament of Uganda
21st-century Ugandan women politicians
21st-century Ugandan politicians
Living people
Wakiso District
Year of birth missing (living people)